The French Paralympic and Sports Committee ( or CPSF) is the National Paralympic Committee in France for the Paralympic Games movement. Founded in Paris in 1992, it is a member of the International Paralympic Committee (IPC) and the French National Olympic and Sports Committee.

See also
 France at the Paralympics

References

External links
 

National Paralympic Committees
Paralympic
France at the Paralympics
Sports organizations established in 1992
1992 establishments in France
Organizations based in Paris